Robotech II: The Sentinels is a 1987 role-playing game supplement for Robotech published by Palladium Books.

Contents
Robotech II: The Sentinels is a supplement and campaign setting describing the background of the "Robotech II" story line; as a players' guide, it includes character statistics, new technology, random encounters, two miniscenarios, and combat data for the soldier.

Publication history
Robotech II: The Sentinels was written by Kevin Siembieda, with art by Kevin Long, and was published by Palladium Books in 1989 as a 144-page book.

Reception
In the June 1989 edition of Games International (Issue 6), Jake Thornton was not pleased with the production values of the book, noting that it was a "flimsy softback with a curled-up cover." He also noted that to properly understand the RPG and its rules, the player would need the first volume in this series of books. What rules there were in this volume he found ambiguous and lacking in cohesion. Thornton concluded by giving this book a very poor rating of only 1 out of 5.

References

Role-playing game supplements introduced in 1987
Science fiction role-playing game supplements